The women's team competition at the 2012 World Team Judo Championships was held on 27 and 28 of October in Salvador, Brazil.

Results

Repechage

References

External links
 

Wteam
World 2012
World Women's Team Judo Championships
World Wteam